Naser Al-Otaibi (born 28 February 1972) is a Kuwaiti handball player. He competed in the 1996 Summer Olympics.

References

External links
 

1972 births
Living people
Handball players at the 1996 Summer Olympics
Kuwaiti male handball players
Olympic handball players of Kuwait